A knuckle tattoo is a kind of tattoo that most commonly uses two groups of four-letter words or one eight-letter word. It is not necessarily a prison tattoo, as sometimes believed, but remains an unpopular form of tattoo—alongside hand tattoos in general—due to the difficulty of hiding it in situations such as a formal setting where it would be seen as crass. Some people also use their knuckles to tattoo drawings and images, sometimes in groups of four, such as the four symbols of a deck of playing cards to signify good luck, or astrological symbols.

Examples 
Robert Mitchum's character Reverend Harry Powell wears LOVE / HATE in the 1955 film The Night of the Hunter. 

In The Blues Brothers, the main characters have JAKE / ELWO/OD on their knuckles.

Musician Flea wears LOVE / LOVE. Professional wrestler CM Punk wears DRUG / FREE.

In sailor tattoo traditions, deckhands may get HOLD / FAST as a charm to support their grip on rigging.

References

External links
 The Knuckle Tattoo Project
 Dubuddha knuckle tattoos gallery

Tattooing by body part